The New York Lizards are a Major League Lacrosse (MLL) professional men's field lacrosse team based in Hempstead, New York, United States, located on Long Island. After the 2012 season the team changed its name from the Long Island Lizards to the New York Lizards. The team will play two of its seven home games in the 2013 season in Icahn Stadium on Randall's Island in New York City. The rest of the home games will be in Hempstead, NY on Long Island.

Current depth chart*
After the first two games of the season, 11 of the 18 players that recorded a statistic in those games were returning players from the 2012 Lizards team.

 Tables above include players with statistics in the first two games of the 2013.  season All-American awards tabulated by LaxPower

On 2013 roster, no stats

Max Seibald (26 years old, Cornell '09) was on the 2013 Lizards injured reserve roster as of 20 May 2013 and had not appeared in a game in the 2013 season as of that date. Seibald was a four-time All-American (2006–2009), on the 1st team three times and on the 2nd team in his freshman year at Cornell. He was Player of the Year in Division I men's lacrosse in 2009. He played with Rob Pannell in the 2009 college season at Cornell. Cornell made it to the final of the Division I men's lacrosse tournament that year before losing to Syracuse 9-10. He played in 10 games in the 2009 season for Denver in the MLL after playing in the NCAA tournament. His first year with the Lizards was in 2012. Seibald was on the US men's national lacrosse team in 2010.

Recent draftees

January 2012 MLL draft*

 Eligible players for January 2012 draft were college players set to maximize college playing eligibility that year as of the time of the draft (January 2012)

Supplemental draft (12/11/12)*

January 2013 MLL draft

 Eligible players for January 2012 draft were college players set to maximize college playing eligibility that year as of the time of the draft (January 2012)

Schedule

Standings

References

External links
Team Website

New York Lizards
New York Lizards
Lizards
New York Lizards seasons